The 2019 Men's Asia-Oceania Floorball Cup was a continental floorball tournament held in Biñan, Philippines from 7–12 July 2019. Matches was held at the Alonte Sports Arena.

Singapore clinched the title after winning 17–1 over defending champions Thailand

Preliminary round

Group A

Group B

Final round

Quarterfinals

Semifinals

Classification 5th–8th

Seventh place playoff

Fifth place playoff

Playoffs

Bronze medal match

Final

Final standing
The official IFF final ranking of the tournament:

External links
Official Website

References

Floorball Asia-Oceania Cup
Asia-Oceania Floorball Cup
July 2019 sports events in the Philippines